The women's 200 metres event  was held on February 19, 1989. The 1989 European Athletics Indoor Championships.

Medalists

Results

Heats
First 3 from each heat qualified directly (Q) for the final.

Final

References

200 metres at the European Athletics Indoor Championships
200
Euro